The Cannon Hill bus station is in Cannon Hill, Brisbane, Queensland, Australia. It is serviced by TransLink bus routes. It is part of the Cannon Hill K-Mart Shopping Centre and is close to Cannon Hill and Murarrie railway stations. It is in a transition precinct between Zone 1 and Zone 2 of the TransLink integrated public transport system.

Bus stations in Brisbane